Quintus Tineius Rufus may refer to:

Quintus Tineius Rufus (consul 127)
Quintus Tineius Rufus (consul 182)